Eucithara vitiensis is a small sea snail, a marine gastropod mollusk in the family Mangeliidae.

Description
The length of the shell attains 11.2 mm, its diameter 4.3 mm.

The shell has an ovate fusiform shape with a narrow base. Its color is dirty white  There is a faint indication of spiral banding . The shell contains 8 whorls, of which two smooth conical whorls in the protoconch.  The rest are convex with a shallow suture. The 12 opisthocline, almost straight axial ribs (11 on the penultimate whorl) are rounded and are wider than the intervals, not becoming weak below suture. The ribs are crossed by fine, flattened threads. The inner lip is smooth or with two small denticles at each end. The ovate aperture is narrow and measures about 10/23 the total length. The columella is callous. The outer lip is incrassate with 11 short denticles. The wide siphonal canal is very short and straight.

Distribution
This marine species occurs off the Fiji Islands.

References

External links
  Tucker, J.K. 2004 Catalog of recent and fossil turrids (Mollusca: Gastropoda). Zootaxa 682:1-1295.
 Kilburn R.N. 1992. Turridae (Mollusca: Gastropoda) of southern Africa and Mozambique. Part 6. Subfamily Mangeliinae, section 1. Annals of the Natal Museum, 33: 461–575

vitiensis
Gastropods described in 1884